Nicolas Basin (born 22 July 1998) is a French former professional footballer who played as a left-back.

Career
Basin is a youth exponent from FC Metz. He made his debut for the Ligue 1 side on 13 August 2016 against Lille replacing Iván Balliu in the 65th minute of a 3–2 home win.

He retired in January 2021 due to recurring injury problems and a badly damaged knee. With his Metz contract running out in June he started studying medicine.

Career statistics

References

External links

Living people
1998 births
People from Forbach
French footballers
Association football fullbacks
Ligue 1 players
Championnat National players
Championnat National 3 players
FC Metz players
US Avranches players
Sportspeople from Moselle (department)
Footballers from Grand Est